The Coast Squadron was a unit in the United States Navy in the early 20th century.

It was organized under the North Atlantic Fleet.

Commanders
 James H. Sands, April 1903 – March 1905
 Francis W. Dickins, March 1905 – April 1906

Ship squadrons of the United States Navy